The Shahlyla Baloch National Women Under-16 Championship is an annual domestic football tournament organized for under-16 teams by the Pakistan Football Federation. Founded in 2014 as the National U-16 Inter-Club Women Football Championship, the tournament was renamed after Shahlyla Baloch, a forward for Pakistan women's national football team, who died in a car accident in 2016.

Tournament summary

See also 

 National Women Football Championship

References 

Football competitions in Pakistan
2014 establishments in Pakistan